This article concerns German Racing Drivers, racing as of the 2013 season onwards, please add to this list